Theopanism (from Greek: Θεός Theos, "God" and πᾶν pan, "all") was first used as a technical term by the Jesuits in elucidating Hinduism.

Theopanism has also been more broadly stated as inclusive of any theological theory by which God is held equivalent to the Universe. As one author puts it: "In theopanism the meaning given the word God is of an entity that is not separate from the universe. Theopanism includes among its major concepts pantheism and panentheism." The broader statement would also include pandeism.

See also
 God becomes the Universe
 Mordechai Nessyahu
 Naturalistic spirituality
 Baruch Spinoza
 Universal Pantheist Society

References

External links
 Why I Believe in God by John J. Lanier, The Builder Magazine, April 1927 - Volume XIII - Number 4

Pantheism
Hindu philosophical concepts